In geometry, a decagram is a 10-point star polygon. There is one regular decagram, containing the vertices of a regular decagon, but connected by every third point. Its Schläfli symbol is {10/3}.

The name decagram combines a numeral prefix, deca-, with the Greek suffix -gram. The -gram suffix derives from γραμμῆς (grammēs) meaning a line.

Regular decagram
For a regular decagram with unit edge lengths, the proportions of the crossing points on each edge are as shown below.

Applications 
Decagrams have been used as one of the decorative motifs in girih tiles.

Isotoxal variations
An isotoxal polygon has two vertices and one edge. There are isotoxal decagram forms, which alternates vertices at two radii. Each form has a freedom of one angle. The first is a variation of a double-wound of a pentagon {5}, and last is a variation of a double-wound of a pentagram {5/2}. The middle is a variation of a regular decagram, {10/3}.

Related figures
A regular decagram is a 10-sided polygram, represented by symbol {10/n}, containing the same vertices as regular decagon. Only one of these polygrams, {10/3} (connecting every third point), forms a regular star polygon, but there are also three ten-vertex polygrams which can be interpreted as regular compounds:
{10/5} is a compound of five degenerate digons 5{2}
{10/4} is a compound of two pentagrams 2{5/2}
{10/2} is a compound of two pentagons 2{5}.

{10/2} can be seen as the 2D equivalent of the 3D compound of dodecahedron and icosahedron and 4D compound of 120-cell and 600-cell; that is, the compound of two pentagonal polytopes in their respective dual positions.

{10/4} can be seen as the two-dimensional equivalent of the three-dimensional compound of small stellated dodecahedron and great dodecahedron or compound of great icosahedron and great stellated dodecahedron through similar reasons. It has six four-dimensional analogues, with two of these being compounds of two self-dual star polytopes, like the pentagram itself; the compound of two great 120-cells and the compound of two grand stellated 120-cells. A full list can be seen at Polytope compound#Compounds with duals.

Deeper truncations of the regular pentagon and pentagram can produce intermediate star polygon forms with ten equally spaced vertices and two edge lengths that remain vertex-transitive (any two vertices can be transformed into each other by a symmetry of the figure).

See also
List of regular polytopes and compounds#Stars

References

10 (number)
10